Sam Pollard may refer to:
 Sam Pollard (missionary) (1864-1915) British missionary to China
 Sam Pollard (filmmaker)